Clarence Sutton may refer to:

 Clarence E. Sutton (1871–1916), U.S. Marine Corps sergeant and Medal of Honor recipient
 Clarence Sutton (American football) (born 1972), American football player and author